Demaine is a hamlet in the southwest Coteau Hills region of Saskatchewan, Canada.

History 
Demaine was named after Frank Demaine who settled in the region in the early 1900s with several other families.

Geography 
Demaine is in the Rural Municipality of Victory No. 226.

Demographics 

References

Designated places in Saskatchewan
Organized hamlets in Saskatchewan
Victory No. 226, Saskatchewan